Joseph Costa (born 17 July 1992) is an Australian footballer who plays for Adelaide Raiders.

Club career
On 3 June 2009 he was signed to a two-year deal by Adelaide United after having made 9 appearances for their inaugural National Youth League squad.

On 7 August 2009 he made his senior debut for Adelaide in the opening game of the season, coming on in the 59th minute against Perth Glory.

Career statistics
(Correct as of 7 August 2009)

Honours
With Australia:
AFF U16 Youth Championship: 2008

References

External links
Adelaide United profile

1992 births
Living people
Australian soccer players
Soccer players from Adelaide
Adelaide United FC players
Adelaide Comets FC players
Adelaide City FC players
A-League Men players
FFSA Super League players
Association football midfielders
South Australian Sports Institute soccer players